"Faithful" is a song by English pop duo Go West. The song is the opening track on the band's fourth album, Indian Summer (1992), and serves as the album's lead single. Written by the band and Martin Page and produced by Peter Wolf, the song reached the top 20 in New Zealand, the United Kingdom, and the United States. Its highest chart position was in Canada, where it peaked at number two in February 1993 (kept off from the top spot by Whitney Houston's "I Will Always Love You"). It also reached number three on the adult contemporary charts of both Canada and the United States.

Track listings
UK 7-inch and cassette single, Australasian cassette single
 "Faithful"
 "I Want You Back"

UK CD1
 "Faithful"
 "I Want You Back"
 "We Close Our Eyes"
 "From Baltimore to Paris"

UK CD2
 "Faithful"
 "I Want You Back"
 "Don't Look Down - The Sequel"
 "I Want to Hear It from You"

US CD and cassette single
 "Faithful" (album version) – 4:24
 "I Want You Back" – 4:19
 "King of Wishful Thinking" – 4:01

Charts

Weekly charts

Year-end charts

References

1992 singles
1992 songs
Chrysalis Records singles
Go West (band) songs
Song recordings produced by Peter Wolf (producer)
Songs written by Martin Page
Songs written by Peter Cox (musician)
Songs written by Richard Drummie